Said Housni (born 1949) is a Moroccan alpine ski racer who competed in the technical events of  giant slalom and slalom at the 1968 Winter Olympics in France.  He was over a minute behind in the GS and finished in 83rd place, and did not advance out of the slalom qualifying round.

Earlier at those Olympics, eighteen-year-old American Karen Budge was testing her wax on a practice course an hour before the women's downhill at Chamrousse, and narrowly avoided a full collision with Housni, who had been warned once before to stay off the hill. She fell, suffered a dislocated shoulder, and did not start.

References

1949 births
Living people
Moroccan male alpine skiers
Olympic alpine skiers of Morocco
Alpine skiers at the 1968 Winter Olympics
People from Azrou
20th-century Moroccan people